The human sex ratio is the comparative number of males with respect to each female in a population. This is a list of sex ratios by country or region.

Methodology 
The table's data is from The World Factbook unless noted otherwise. It shows the male to female sex ratio by the Central Intelligence Agency of the United States. If there is a discrepancy between The World Factbook and a country's census data, the latter may be used instead. 

A ratio above 1, for example 1.1, means there are more males than females (1.1 males for every female). A ratio below 1, for example 0.8, means there are more females than males (0.8 males for every female). A ratio of 1 means there are equal numbers of males and females.

Countries

See also 
 List of Chinese administrative divisions by sex ratio
 List of states and union territories of India by sex ratio
 Missing women

References 

Demographic lists
Sex ratio